James Broad (10 November 1891 – 22 August 1963) was an English footballer who played as a forward for various Football League clubs in the 1910s and 1920s, including Oldham Athletic, Stoke and Everton. His brother Tommy was also a footballer.

Career
Born in Stalybridge, Cheshire (now Greater Manchester), Broad began his football career with St Mark's (West Gorton), before moving to Stalybridge Celtic. He joined Manchester City in 1911, Manchester United in 1912, and then Oldham Athletic in 1913, without having made an appearance for either United or City. In his one season with Oldham, Broad made 15 appearances and scored five goals, but he was allowed to join Morton of Scotland in 1914. He returned to England with Millwall in 1919, scoring 39 goals in 54 games for the club, mostly in the Southern Football League.

Broad was brought to Stoke by wealthy director John Slater along with his brother Tommy. The idea was that winger Tommy would supply crosses for Jimmy to convert and it worked very well as in 1921–22 Stoke gained promotion with Jimmy top-scoring with 27 goals. However Stoke struggled in the First Division and despite Jimmy scoring 26 goals Stoke were relegated back to the Second Division. In 1923–24 a promotion challenge failed to materialise and at the end of the season the board decided to reduce the wage bill by releasing ten players which included the Broad brothers. Jimmy and eight unwanted teammates arrived at the Victoria Ground and ransacked the offices causing a considerable amount of damage.

He joined Everton in 1924, via Sittingbourne, and scored eight goals in 18 games for the Toffees. In 1925, he moved to New Brighton, for whom he scored three goals in 11 matches, and then he joined Watford in 1926. After just one game for Watford, in which he scored a goal, Broad was sacked for a breach of discipline. He moved into non-league football with Caernarvon Town and Taunton Town, before returning to New Brighton at the age of 38. However, he did not make any appearances for New Brighton before joining Fleetwood.

He then went on to do some coaching with Deportivo de La Coruña in Spain as well as in Turkey, Switzerland, Italy, Norway, Holland and South Africa. At the age of 40 in 1931 he finally settled down taking up the post of groundsman at Chelmsford City a position he kept until his death in 1963.

Career statistics
Source:

Honours
 Stoke
 Football League Second Division runner-up: 1922–23

References
General
 
 

Specific

1891 births
1963 deaths
People from Stalybridge
English footballers
Association football forwards
Manchester City F.C. players
Stalybridge Celtic F.C. players
Manchester United F.C. players
Oldham Athletic A.F.C. players
Greenock Morton F.C. players
Millwall F.C. players
Stoke City F.C. players
Sittingbourne F.C. players
Everton F.C. players
New Brighton A.F.C. players
Watford F.C. players
Caernarfon Town F.C. players
Taunton Town F.C. players
Fleetwood Town F.C. players
English Football League players
Chelmsford City F.C. non-playing staff
Association football coaches